Miguel Antonio Zúniga is a Honduran politician. He serves as Honduras's Minister of Development and Social Inclusion.

References

Living people
Government ministers of Honduras
Year of birth missing (living people)
Place of birth missing (living people)